Arlington is a city in Calhoun and Early counties, Georgia, United States. Per the 2020 census, the population was 1,209.

History
Arlington was founded in 1873, and was chartered in 1881. Arlington served as county seat from 1923 to 1929. The community was named after the Arlington House, the Virginia home of General Robert E. Lee.

Geography
Arlington is located at  (31.439461, -84.724835). It is located 46 miles northeast of Dothan, Alabama and 45 miles southwest of Albany.

Demographics

2020 census

Note: the US Census treats Hispanic/Latino as an ethnic category. This table excludes Latinos from the racial categories and assigns them to a separate category. Hispanics/Latinos can be of any race.

2000 Census
As of the census of 2000, there were 1,602 people, 573 households, and 394 families residing in the city. The racial makeup of the city was 29.03% White, 69.91% African American, 0.12% Native American, 0.19% Asian, 0.44% from other races, and 0.31% from two or more races. Hispanic or Latino of any race were 1.44% of the population.

There were 573 households, out of which 33.9% had children under the age of 18 living with them, 37.0% were married couples living together, 28.6% had a female householder with no husband present, and 31.2% were non-families. 28.1% of all households were made up of individuals, and 12.4% had someone living alone who was 65 years of age or older.  The average household size was 2.80 and the average family size was 3.47.

In the city, the population was spread out, with 32.8% under the age of 18, 9.6% from 18 to 24, 27.7% from 25 to 44, 17.0% from 45 to 64, and 12.9% who were 65 years of age or older.  The median age was 31 years. For every 100 females, there were 84.6 males.  For every 100 females age 18 and over, there were 79.6 males.

The median income for a household in the city was $22,311, and the median income for a family was $25,188. Males had a median income of $22,096 versus $15,231 for females. The per capita income for the city was $11,985.  About 30.1% of families and 34.4% of the population were below the poverty line, including 49.6% of those under age 18 and 28.9% of those age 65 or over.

Notable person
James Earl Carter, Sr., farmer, businessman, legislator, father of President Jimmy Carter

Education 
On Calhoun County's side of the Calhoun County School District unit, Calhoun County Elementary School (grades K-5) serves   Calhoun County, including some students from Arlington, Edison, Leary, and Morgan. Calhoun County Middle/High are in Edison. On Early County's side, all schools belong to the Early County School District; elementary, middle, and high schools are in Blakely, including Early County High School.

Gallery

References

Cities in Georgia (U.S. state)
Cities in Calhoun County, Georgia
Cities in Early County, Georgia
Former county seats in Georgia (U.S. state)